The women's discus throw event at the 2010 World Junior Championships in Athletics was held in Moncton, New Brunswick, Canada, at Moncton Stadium on 20 and 22 July.

Medalists

Results

Final
22 July

Qualifications
20 July

Group A

Group B

Participation
According to an unofficial count, 27 athletes from 20 countries participated in the event.

References

Discus throw
Discus throw at the World Athletics U20 Championships
2010 in women's athletics